Hypericum aegypticum subsp. aegypticum is a subspecies of Hypericum aegypticum in the section Adenotrias in the genus Hypericum. It is a spreading plant that grows from 20 to 180 centimeters tall.

References

aegypticum subsp. aegypticum
Plant subspecies
Endemic flora of Malta